This is a list of electricity-generating power stations in the U.S. state of Vermont, sorted by type and name. In 2020, Vermont had a total summer capacity of 829 MW through all of its power plants, and a net generation of 2,156 GWh. The corresponding electrical energy generation mix in 2021 was 50% hydroelectric, 25% biomass, 15.7% wind, 8.8% solar photovoltaics, 0.1% fossil fuels, and 0.3% other. Small-scale solar, which includes customer-owned photovoltaic panels, delivered an additional net 187 GWh to the state's electrical grid. This was about equal to the generation by Vermont's utility-scale photovoltaic plants.

Vermont's 99.9% share of electricity from renewable sources was the highest in the United States during 2019. Vermont had the second lowest population after Wyoming, and total electricity consumption was the lowest among all 50 states.  Vermont consumed three times more electricity than it generated in-state, and imported most of its electricity needs from Canada and New York. Vermont's Renewable Electricity Standard aims for the state to obtain 90% of all electricity from renewable sources by 2050, in part by further reducing per-capita consumption through less waste and greater efficiency of electricity use.

Nuclear power stations
The Vermont Yankee Nuclear Power Plant generated 620 MW of base load electricity during years 1972–2014. Vermont had no operating utility-scale plants that used fissile material as a fuel in 2019.

Fossil-fuel power stations
Data from the U.S. Energy Information Administration serves as a general reference.

Coal-fired
Vermont had no operating utility-scale plants that used coal as a fuel in 2019.

Natural gas-fired
Vermont had no operating utility-scale plants that used fossil gas as a primary fuel in 2019 (see also Biomass).

Petroleum-fired
Note: All plants fueled by petroleum in Vermont were peaker plants in 2019.

Renewable power stations
Data from the U.S. Energy Information Administration serves as a general reference.

Biomass

Hydroelectric

Wind

Solar

References

Lists of buildings and structures in Vermont
 
Vermont